San Francisco Fútbol Club is a professional football team located in La Chorrera, Panamá, that plays in Liga Panameña de Fútbol, the top Panamanian football league. It has been in the top flight of Panamanian football every year since 1988, when Panama's first professional league was organized.  The club plays its games in Estadio Agustín Sánchez.

San Francisco have won 9 Liga Panameña de Fútbol championships, the third highest total of any team since 1988. The club has also finished second 9 times since 1988.

History

Deportivo La Previsora
The club was founded in September 1971, and began playing in La Chorrera District league.  At that time, the club was known as Club Deportivo La Previsora.  It has been in continuous operation ever since. An early contender in ANAPROF (the first Panamanian professional league), La Previsora reached the finals in each of the league's first two seasons (losing to Plaza Amador and Tauro FC).

Since then, they have been regular contenders for national honors, winning nine titles (most recently in Apertura 2014).

San Francisco F.C.
The club's current name is derived from the patron saint of the La Chorrera District, Francis of Paola (San Francisco de Paula). The club was the best supported club in the LPF in 2011, averaging an attendance of 765 at their matches.

Honours
Liga Panameña de Fútbol: 9
1994–95, 1995–96, 2005 (C), 2006 (A), 2007 (C), 2008 (A), 2009 (A), 2011 (C), 2014 (A)

Copa Panamá: 1
2015

Players

Current squad
First team squad 2022

Notable players

Personnel

Management

Historical list of coaches

 Edgardo Baldi (1979)
 Saúl Suárez (1988–90)
 Leopoldo "Chino" Lee (1995–97)
  Gary Stempel (1996–98), (2001–07)
 Miguel Mansilla (2004)
 Pascual "Chato" Ramírez (Jan 2007–March 7)
 Rubén Guevara (March 2007–07) 
 Cristóbal Maldonado (200?–March 9)
 Rubén Guevara (March 2009–09)
  Gary Stempel (Oct 2009–10)
 Leonardo Ezequiel Pipino (December 2010 - October 12)
  Gary Stempel (October 2012 – 2016)
 Mike Stump (June 2016- February 2017)
 Pascual Moreno (February 2017 - August 2017)
 Andrés Domínguez (August 2017 - September 2018)
 Sergio "Checho" Angulo (September 2017 - December 2018)
 Gonzalo Soto (January 2019 - March 2021)
 José Manuel Rodríguez (March 2021 - June 2021)
 Carlos Leiria (June 2021 - September 2021)
 Jorge Santos (September 2021 - December 2021)
 Gonzalo Soto (January 2022 -Present)

References

External links
 Official website

 
Football clubs in Panama
Association football clubs established in 1971
1971 establishments in Panama